Cha Cha Cha Films is a film production company founded by Alfonso Cuarón, Alejandro González Iñárritu and Guillermo del Toro. The first film released under the Cha Cha Cha banner was Rudo y Cursi, which the three partners produced but did not direct.

Filmography  
 Rudo y Cursi (2008)
 Mother and Child (2009)
 Biutiful (2010)
 The Book of Life (2014) (Uncredited)
 Trollhunters (2016–2018)
 Saturn and the End of Days (TBA)

References 

 
Film production companies of Mexico
Mass media companies established in 2007
Mass media in Mexico City